Karatas may refer to:
Karataş (disambiguation)
Karata people, an indigenous people of the Caucasus
a generic synonym of the plant genus Bromelia